Kyrgyzstan is an eponymously-named centrist political party in Kyrgyzstan. It was established in May 2015, by Kanatbek Isaev, a former Respublika Member of Parliament. It is viewed as "utterly apolitical" and focusing on supporting the government of Kyrgyz President Sooronbay Jeenbekov.

The party has a strong support base in the south of the country. In the 2015 Parliamentary elections, the Kyrgyzstan Party won 18 seats, having gained 12.75% of the votes.

References

External links
Official website (Russian version; archived 14 August 2018)

Political parties in Kyrgyzstan